The porous medium equation, also called the nonlinear heat equation, is a nonlinear partial differential equation taking the form:where  is the Laplace operator.

Solutions 
Despite being a nonlinear equation, the porous medium equation may be solved exactly using separation of variables or a similarity solution. However, the separation of variables solution is known to blow up to infinity at a finite time.

Barenblatt-Kompaneets-Zeldovich similarity solution 
The final solution to the porous medium equation under these scalings is:where  is the -norm,  is the positive part, and the coefficients are given by:

Applications 
The porous medium equation has been found to have a number of applications in gas flow, heat transfer, and groundwater flow.

Gas flow 
The porous medium equation name originates from its use in describing the flow of an ideal gas in a homogeneous porous medium. We require three equations to completely specify the medium's density , flow velocity field , and pressure : the continuity equation for conservation of mass; Darcy's law for flow in a porous medium; and the ideal gas equation of state.

Heat transfer 
The thermal conductivity of high-temperature plasmas seems to follow a power law.

See also 

 Diffusion equation
 Porous medium

References

External links 

 The Porous Medium Equation: Mathematical theory

Partial differential equations
Diffusion
Hydrogeology
Heat transfer
Transport phenomena
Exactly solvable models